As a candidate country of the European Union, Turkey (TR) is included in the Nomenclature of Territorial Units for Statistics (NUTS). Defined in 2002 in agreement between Eurostat and the Turkish authorities, Turkey's NUTS classifications are officially termed statistical regions, as Turkey is not a member of the EU and Eurostat only defines NUTS for member states. The three NUTS levels are:
 NUTS-1: 12 Regions
 NUTS-2: 26 Subregions
 NUTS-3: 81 Provinces

Below the NUTS levels, there are two LAU levels:
 LAU-1: 923 districts
 LAU-2: 37,675 municipalities
The NUTS codes are as follows:

See also
 FIPS region codes of Turkey
 ISO 3166-2 codes of Turkey
 Subdivisions of Turkey
List of Turkish regions by Human Development Index

References

External links
 Overview of the NUTS 2013 Classification
 Statistics Illustrated. Interactive map of NUTS levels.
 Regional Statistics Illustrated. Interactive map of statistics indicators by NUTS levels.
 Provinces of Turkey, Statoids.com

Turkey
 
Statistical subregions of Turkey
Subdivisions of Turkey
Turkey–European Union relations